Martina Navratilova defeated the defending champion Chris Evert in the final, 6–2, 4–6, 6–2 to win the women's singles tennis title at the 1985 Australian Open. It was her third Australian Open singles title and 13th major singles title overall.

Seeds
The seeded players are listed below. Martina Navratilova is the champion; others show the round in which they were eliminated.

  Chris Evert (finalist)
  Martina Navratilova (champion)
  Hana Mandlíková (semifinals)
  Pam Shriver (third round)
  Claudia Kohde-Kilsch (semifinals)
  Zina Garrison (quarterfinals)
  Manuela Maleeva (quarterfinals)
  Helena Suková (quarterfinals)
  Wendy Turnbull (third round)
  Catarina Lindqvist (quarterfinals)
  Barbara Potter (second round)
  Bettina Bunge (first round)
  Jo Durie (third round)
  Lisa Bonder (second round)
  Pascale Paradis (first round)
  Katerina Maleeva (third round)

Qualifying

Draw

Key
 Q = Qualifier
 WC = Wild card
 LL = Lucky loser
 r = Retired

Finals

Earlier rounds

Section 1

Section 2

Section 3

Section 4

See also
 Evert–Navratilova rivalry

External links
 1985 Australian Open – Women's draws and results at the International Tennis Federation

Women's singles
Australian Open (tennis) by year – Women's singles
1985 in Australian women's sport
1985 Virginia Slims World Championship Series